Eutropis longicaudata, the longtail mabuya or long-tailed sun skink, is a species of skink. It is found in southern China, Hong Kong, Taiwan, Laos, Vietnam, Thailand, Cambodia, and Peninsular Malaysia.

Some populations have been found to exhibit paternal care in response to predation by egg-eating snakes.

References

External links
 Flickr Photo from Taiwan by Liang Ching Hou
 Flickr Photo from Thailand by Michael Cota

Eutropis
Reptiles of Cambodia
Reptiles of China
Reptiles of Hong Kong
Reptiles of Laos
Reptiles of Malaysia
Reptiles of Taiwan
Reptiles of Thailand
Reptiles of Vietnam
Reptiles described in 1857
Taxa named by Edward Hallowell (herpetologist)